Canada South Science City is an interactive science centre/museum in Windsor, Ontario, Canada. In 2021 the organization posted a notice on their website that they've closed the centre to the public as a result of vandalism, with hopes to reopen in the future. 

Canada South Science City is located in the former J.L. Forster Secondary School (renamed the Forster Community Hub) at 749 Felix Avenue in one of Windsor's most historic communities, Sandwich Town, on the city's west end.

Inside the main building includes:
 Biodiversity Exhibit
 Fossil Dig Site for children
 Lagoon section with live reptiles
 Exploratorium which includes many interactive physics and other exhibits
 Science Cafe for lunches and discussion panels
 Summer Camp room
 Computer Lab

Initially funded by a grant from the City of Windsor, Science City is now overseen by a volunteer board of directors. It is a completely community run non-profit facility.

Reference section

External links

Science museums in Canada
Museums in Windsor, Ontario
Museums established in 2004